Uchan-su, is a waterfall on the river Uchan-su on the southern slopes of the Crimean Mountains in Crimea. The name translates from the Crimean Tatar language for flying water.

Uchan-su, the highest waterfall in Crimea, is a popular tourist attraction located 7 km from the city of Yalta halfway to Ai-Petri Mountain. The water originates from one of the Ai-Petri tops which falls onto the shallow water .

References

Waterfalls of Crimea